Johannes Jansen may refer to:

Johannes Henricus Gerardus Jansen (1868–1936), archbishop of Utrecht and Roman Catholic Primate of the Netherlands
Johannes Jansen (mayor), mayor of New York, 1725–1726
Johannes J.G. Jansen (1942–2015), scholar of contemporary Islam in the Netherlands
Johannes Janssen (1829–1891), German historian

See also
Hans Jansen (disambiguation)
Johannes Jansen House, Shawangunk, New York